Adolphe Teikeu Kamgang (born 23 June 1990) is a Cameroonian professional footballer who plays as a defender for the French  club Caen and the Cameroon national team.

Career

Club career
Born in Bandjoun, Adolphe Teikeu began his career in Cameroon with Arsenal Yaoundé. During the winter transfer window of 2009 he was transferred to FC Metalurh Zaporizhya.

In February 2015, Teikeu joined FC Terek Grozny on loan.

International career
Adolphe Teikeu has played for Cameroon at Under-20 level. In 2009, he played in the 2009 FIFA U-20 World Cup, where he played three games. Teikeu made his debut for the Cameroon national football team against South Africa in March 2016. He also won the African Cup of Nations with Cameroon in 2017.

Career statistics

International

References

External links
 
 
 Profile at FC Metalurh Zaporizhya
 

1990 births
People from West Region (Cameroon)
Living people
Cameroonian footballers
Cameroon international footballers
Association football defenders
FC Metalurh Zaporizhzhia players
FC Krasnodar players
FC Chornomorets Odesa players
FC Akhmat Grozny players
FC Sochaux-Montbéliard players
Ohod Club players
Büyükşehir Belediye Erzurumspor footballers
Stade Malherbe Caen
Ukrainian Premier League players
Russian Premier League players
Ligue 2 players
Saudi Professional League players
Süper Lig players
Championnat National 2 players
2017 Africa Cup of Nations players
2017 FIFA Confederations Cup players
Africa Cup of Nations-winning players
Cameroonian expatriate footballers
Expatriate footballers in Ukraine
Cameroonian expatriate sportspeople in Ukraine
Expatriate footballers in Russia
Cameroonian expatriate sportspeople in Russia
Expatriate footballers in France
Cameroonian expatriate sportspeople in France
Expatriate footballers in Saudi Arabia
Cameroonian expatriate sportspeople in Saudi Arabia
Expatriate footballers in Turkey
Cameroonian expatriate sportspeople in Turkey